Damasi may refer to:
 Damës, Gjirokastër, Albania
 Damasi, Larissa, Greece